Pteroxys uniformis is a moth of the family Psychidae first described by George Hampson in 1892. It is found in India and Sri Lanka.

References

Moths of Asia
Moths described in 1892
Psychidae